My Summer in Provence is a 2014 French drama film directed by Rose Bosch.

Cast 
 Jean Reno - Paul Mazuret
 Anna Galiena - Irène
 Chloé Jouannet - Léa
  - Adrien
  - Théo
 Aure Atika - Magali

References

External links 

2014 drama films
French drama films
2010s French films